Kepler-296 b is an s-type exoplanet located in the binary star system Kepler-296. All 5 planets in this system orbit around the primary star.

It has been classed as a hot superterran.

It was discovered by the Kepler space telescope in 2014 using the transit method and was originally classed as a planet candidate, but during a study by members of the NASA Ames Research Center on two other planets in the Kepler-296 system, Kepler-296f and Kepler-296e, they were able to confirm that Kepler-296 b is an exoplanet with "more than 99% confidence".

Data 
As with most other exoplanets, not many parameters are known about Kepler-296b. The few that are, are listed in the infobox to the right.

References

Kepler-296
Exoplanets discovered in 2014
Exoplanets discovered by the Kepler space telescope
Transiting exoplanets